Koh or KOH may refer to:

Chemistry 
 Potassium hydroxide, formula "KOH"
 KOH test, a procedure in which potassium hydroxide is used to dissolve skin and reveal fungal cells under the microscope

People 
 Koh (surname), a surname with various origins, including:
 Xǔ (surname), a Chinese surname sometimes spelled as Koh based on its pronunciation in Southern Min dialects
 Ko (Korean surname), occasionally spelled as Koh

People with the given name Koh include:
 Koh Gabriel Kameda (born 1975), German-Japanese concert violinist and violin teacher
 Koh Kojima or Kō Kojima (born 1928), Japanese manga artist
 Koh Traoré (born 1989), Burkinabé born Ivorian football player
 Koh Yasuda (1907–1943), Japanese ophthalmologist, first director of Amami Wakoen Sanatorium, a leprosy sanatorium in Japan

Places 
 , a Khmer word meaning 'island', found in names of islands of Cambodia
 , a Thai loanword from Khmer meaning 'island', found in names of islands of Thailand
 , a Dari word meaning 'mountain', found in names of mountains of Afghanistan
 , an Urdu loanword from Persian meaning 'mountain', found in names of mountains of Pakistan

Other 
 Koh the Face Stealer, a character in Avatar: The Last Airbender
 King of the Hammers, an off-road race in Johnson Valley, California, United States

See also 
 
 Koh-i-Noor, a  diamond
 Kou (disambiguation) (which might be confused due to similar pronunciation)
 KKOH, a radio station in Reno, Nevada, US